Blanford's fox (Vulpes cana) is a small fox native to the Middle East and Central Asia. It is listed as Least Concern on the IUCN Red List.

Naming
Blanford's fox is named after the English naturalist William Thomas Blanford, who described it in 1877. It is also known as the Afghan fox, royal fox, dog fox, hoary fox, steppe fox, black fox, king fox, cliff fox or Balochistan fox.

Distribution and habitat
The Blanford's fox has a rather discontinuous range. Initially known only from southwest Asia, this species was reported in Israel in 1981 and was later found to be more widespread in the Arabian Peninsula. Peters and Rödel (1994) reviewed the available distribution records of this species and presented, for the eastern part of the range, what they considered to be definitive records from around the Iranian Plateau in Iran, Turkmenistan and Pakistan, with more doubtful records (usually based on skins collected from fur bazaars or otherwise indirectly) from Afghanistan and Tajikistan (though there is no such record).

There are now confirmed records in the Middle East from Jordan, the Sinai Peninsula (Egypt), Oman, Saudi Arabia and the United Arab Emirates. They have long been suspected of occurring in Yemen and have been reported at an altitude of about 1,200 m above sea level in Hawf Forest, Al Mahra Governorate, in the far east of Yemen, near the border with Oman. It also seemed possible that they may have lived in western Yemen, where the mountains in southwestern Arabia were contiguous, and the camera trapping record in February 2014 in Wadi Sharis in Hajjah Governorate, NW of Sana'a, now confirms their existence. There is a single record from Egypt, west of the Suez Canal, of an animal captured in 1988, originally believed to be Vulpes rueppellii. There are no verified documents from Syria, but they may have existed.

It was also sighted in northern Saudi Arabia and in the Western Hajar Mountains of Ras Al Khaimah. In 2019, it was spotted in Jebel Hafeet, United Arab Emirates.

Description

Blanford's fox is a small fox with wide ears and a long, bushy tail nearly equal to the length of its body. Its body size often varies geographically. Weights of those specimens averaged 873g, body lengths 42 cm, tail 32.5 cm. Among all extant canids, only the fennec fox is smaller than Blanford's.

The body is brownish-grey, fading to light yellow on the belly. The winter coat is soft and woolly, with a dense black undercoat and white fur speckles in the dorsal area; together with a somewhat thicker layer of fat, it serves as thermal insulation in cold and dry winter. The summer coat is less thick, the fur is paler, and the white hair is less noticeable. A characteristic mid-dorsal black band extends caudally from the nape of the spine, becoming a mid-dorsal crest along the length of the tail. The tail is the same colour as the body. A black spot is found at the base of the spine. The tip of the tail is normally black, but it is white in some individuals. The dark mid-dorsal line, which is a distinctive characteristic of the Israeli specimens, is less noticeable in Oman specimens, although the black tail markings are similarly developed.

Like other arid land foxes, Blanford's fox characteristically large ear is an adaptation to enhance heat dissipation. However, unlike other desert foxes, it does not have pads covered with hair, and it has cat-like, curved, sharp claws described by some authors as semiretractile.

The foxes use their sharp, curved claws and naked footpads for traction on narrow ledges and their long, bushy tails as a counterbalance.

Behaviour and ecology
The Blanford's fox is strictly nocturnal, an activity pattern that is most definitely an anti-predator response to diurnal raptors. There are no significant seasonal or gender variations in the activity patterns, and climate conditions at night in the desert of Israel seemed to have little direct effect on their activity, except under extreme conditions.

Diet
Blanford's fox is omnivorous and primarily insectivorous and frugivorous. In Israel, plant food consists mainly of the fruit of two caperbush species, Capparis cartilaginea and Capparis spinosa; they also consume fruits and plant material of date palm (Phoenix dactylifera), Ochradenus baccatus, Fagonia mollis, and various species of Gramineae. Blanford's foxes in Pakistan are largely frugivorous, feeding on Russian olives (Elaeagnus hortensis), melons, and grapes. The Biblical foxes in the vineyard mentioned in the Song of Songs 2:15, described as "little foxes who ruin the vineyards" are most probably the frugivorous Blanford's foxes.

Blanford's foxes are almost always solitary foragers, only foraging in pairs on occasion. Unlike other fox species, it seldom caches food.

Reproduction
Blanford's foxes are thought to be strictly monogamous. Monogamy may be beneficial in this species as the dispersion of their prey is such that, in order to accommodate additional adults, it would demand a territorial expansion that would bring more costs than benefits.
Females are monoestrus and come into heat during January–February. Gestation period is around 50–60 days, and litter size is one to three. The lactation period is 30–45 days. Neonates are born with soft, black fur, with an estimated body mass of 29 g. At the age of two months, the kits start to forage with one of the parents, and at 3 months of age they begin to forage on their own. Juveniles have similar markings as adults, but their fur is darker and more grayish. Sexual maturity is reached at the age of 10–12 months.

Average lifespan of Blandford's foxes is 4 to 5 years, and does not exceed 10 years in the wild.

Conservation
While the IUCN has downgraded Blanford's fox to "least concern" as more has been learned about the breadth of its distribution across the Middle East, very little is known about this species and its vulnerabilities to the diseases of domesticated dogs that have so badly affected other canids.  Currently, little competition exists with humans for habitat, and the fox is a protected species in Israel and protected from hunting in Oman and Yemen.  Some fur hunting occurs in Afghanistan, and occasionally they may take poison intended for hyenas and other species.

See also
Wildlife of Afghanistan
Wildlife of Egypt
Wildlife of Iran
Wildlife of Israel
Wildlife of Jordan
Wildlife of Oman
Wildlife of Pakistan
Wildlife of Saudi Arabia
Wildlife of the United Arab Emirates
Wildlife of Yemen

References

Further reading
Abu Baker, M. A. et al., (2004). On the Current Status and Distribution of Blanford's fox, Vulpes cana Blanford, 1877, in Jordan (Mammalia: Carnivora: Canidae). Turk. J. Zool., 28: 1–6.
Geffen, E., R. Hefner, D. W. Macdonald & Ucko M. (1992). Habitat selection and home range in the Blanford's fox, Vulpes cana: compatibility with the Resource Dispersion Hypothesis. Oecologia 91: 75–81.
Stuart, C.T. & Stuart, T. (1995). Canids in the southeastern Arabian Peninsula. Canid News 3:30–32.

External links

ARKive – images and movies of the Blanford's fox (Vulpes cana)
IUCN/SSC Canid Specialist Group: Blanford's Fox
The 4 fox species of the UAE (Gulf News)

Blanford's fox
Mammals of Western Asia
Mammals of the Middle East
Fauna of the Middle East
Fauna of Egypt
Mammals of the Arabian Peninsula
Blanford's fox